Mohamed Jemâa (born 9 May 1988) is a Tunisian football midfielder.

References

1988 births
Living people
Tunisian footballers
ES Métlaoui players
AS Gabès players
Association football midfielders
Tunisian Ligue Professionnelle 1 players